Vítor Manuel Fernandes Alves (born 11 April 1985), is a Portuguese footballer playing for C.D.C. Montalegre.

Club career
Though Alves, played for the youth academy of Porto, he could not break into the first team and instead had to remain contended with 42 appearances between 2004 and 2006 for Porto B. After playing for clubs in the lower divisions, he signed with Santa Clara in 2009 and played there till 2011. His second season with the Segunda Liga club was hindered by injuries.

In July 2012, he signed for another club in the Segunda Liga, Naval. The following season, he stepped a division lower with Freamunde.

References

External links

1985 births
Living people
Association football defenders
Portuguese footballers
People from Sabrosa
FC Porto B players
C.F. União players
S.C. Beira-Mar players
G.D. Chaves players
C.D. Santa Clara players
Associação Naval 1º de Maio players
S.C. Freamunde players
C.D. Tondela players
C.D. Aves players
Juventude de Pedras Salgadas players
C.D.C. Montalegre players
GS Loures players
Liga Portugal 2 players
Segunda Divisão players
Portugal youth international footballers
Sportspeople from Vila Real District